Jools is a British noise rock from Leicester.  The band consists of Mitchell Gordon, Kate Price, Ellis Crowson, Pete McLeod, Tom Selby, Ryan Chapman and Sam
Shooter.

History 
Jools formed in Leicester in early 2019 with members Mitchell Gordon, Ellis Crowson, Chris Johnston, Sam Shooter, Tom Selby, and Pete McLeod. The band took their name "Jools" from Jools Holland, after they watched the band Shame, perform on Holland's late-night talk show, Later... with Jools Holland. 

The band describes their sound as being influenced by the Beat Generation movement, and describe bands such as The Cure, Pixies and The Streets as influences. 

On 12 November 2019, Jools released their first single, "Hysterical Starving Naked". In describing the track, Ellie Howorth from LDOI said that the band takes "gritty punk vocals, and places them alongside roaring guitars, broad basslines and thrashing drums, crafting a pit-inducing heavy rock sound." Following the release of the single, Jools was compared to several post-punk and noise rock bands from the region, including IDLES, Shame, and Fontaines D.C.

In early 2020, Jools released their second single, "Spineless" on 27 March 2020, which was lauded by some critics for the pro-socialist lyrics. Matthew Brocklehurt, writing for When the Horn Blows called "Spineless" the band coming into their own.

Discography

Singles 
 "Hysterical Starving Naked" (2019)
 "Spineless" (2020)
 "How Can Some Experience What Pride Is Without Liberation for All" (2020)
 "Cross-Dressing in a Freudian Slip" (2020)

References

External links 
 

English punk rock groups
British noise rock groups
Garage punk groups
Musical groups from Leicester
Musical groups established in 2019
2019 establishments in England
Sextets